Neil Mercer is Emeritus Professor of Education at the University of Cambridge.

Mercer grew up in Cockermouth in Cumbria, where he went to Cockermouth Grammar School before studying psychology at the University of Manchester. He has a PhD in psycholinguistics from the University of Leicester. His research explores the role of dialogue in education and the development of children's reasoning.

Biography
He is Emeritus Professor of Education at the University of Cambridge, where he is also Director of the study Centre Oracy Cambridge and a Life Fellow of the college Hughes Hall.
Prior to moving to the University of Cambridge, he was Director of the Open University's Centre for Research in Education and Educational Technologies (CREET). and a member of the Centre for Language and Communications.
He was previously co-editor of the journal Learning, Culture and Social Interaction, editor of the journal Learning and Instruction and the International Journal of Educational Research.

Research
Mercer has emphasised the use of language to "inter-think" and build "common knowledge" – shared understandings and perspectives to work together, particularly in classrooms.  From Common Knowledge onwards his work has been explicitly Vygotskian in nature, fitting into a wider sociocultural and dialogic learning focus in education. (See e.g.)
However, in contrast to Lev Vygotsky's Zone of Proximal Development, Mercer proposes we consider the 'Intermental Development Zone' – the space that language creates which allows peers to interact and develop their reasoning together, in the absence of a guiding teacher.  This work is cited as important in development of understanding of language for learning. 

Mercer's key interest is in the quality of talk and its impact on educational outcomes, including talk in the home for example, arguing that "'social interaction and collaborative activity' in class can provide 'valuable opportunities' for learning" and that classroom talk should be oriented around co-operation rather than competitiveness, to encourage exploratory talk rather than disputational where the former focuses on explaining ideas, listening to others, and the building of mutual understanding and the latter on a lack of constructive argument which is characterised by disagreement with little explanation.  Research exploring this typology and its third component – cumulative talk, in which ideas are shared but not built upon or critically analysed – has found "evidence of the link between the development of children's communication skills and improvements in their critical thinking.", leading to the suggestion that there should be more focus on these skills in classrooms, and commensurately teacher education programs, including in the context of computer use. This approach has been termed (and researched under the banner of) "Thinking Together". This approach has been used internationally particularly in Mexico (see e.g.) and recently Chile.
Mercer's research into the educationally salient components of discourse has been grounded in 'sociocultural discourse analysis' – a theory to which he has contributed.  Sociocultural discourse analysis focuses on what language is used to do, and in Mercer's work, how it is used to share meaning, create common knowledge, and interthink.

References

External links
Thinkingtogether.educ.cam.ac.uk
Tes.co.uk

Year of birth missing (living people)
Living people
English psychologists
Academics of the University of Cambridge
Alumni of the University of Leicester